Kathleen Margaret "Kit" Lewis (27 September 1911 – 1998) was a British painter.

The daughter of Henry Bryan Godfrey Godfrey-Faussett-Osborne and Margaret Sydney Bourns, she was born Kathleen Margaret Godfrey-Faussett-Osborne in Lichfield, Staffordshire. She studied at the Chelsea College of Art under Graham Sutherland. In 1940, she married Edward Morland Lewis, an artist who died in North Africa in 1943 while employed as a war artist. In 1954, she married Sir James Maude Richards, an architectural writer; the couple had one son. Lewis joined The London Group in 1948. In 1953, she had her first solo show at the Leicester Galleries and continued to show there on a frequent basis.

References

External links

1911 births
1998 deaths
20th-century British painters
20th-century British women artists
Alumni of Chelsea College of Arts
English women painters
People from Lichfield
20th-century English women
20th-century English people